The Aviastroitel AC-7M is a Russian mid-wing, T-tailed, two-seats in side-by-side configuration motor glider that was designed by Vladimir Egorovich Fedorov and produced by Aviastroitel, now Glider Air Craft.

Design and development
Development of the AC-7M was started in 2002, it was first flown in 2005 and by 2006 two prototypes had been completed.

The AC-7M is a conventional self-launching sailplane, but is equipped with a more powerful retractable pusher configuration Hirth F30A25A  two stroke engine than is normal in these types, allowing it to be also used as a glider tug and as touring motor glider.

The AC-7M uses a two bladed wooden propeller of  diameter. The  span wing employs a Wortmann FX60-157 airfoil and mounts Fowler flaps. The wings are mounted on the fuselage with a single cam-pin and the ailerons and air brakes hook-up automatically. The fixed landing gear consists of a narrow track pair of rubber-suspended  main wheels, a  nose wheel and a  tail caster. The main wheels incorporate lever-actuated drum brakes. The canopy provides 300° field of view and is jettisonable. Assembly from its trailer takes four people 20 minutes.

The AC-7M was later developed into the unpowered and redesigned AC-7.

Variants
AC-7M
Side-by-side, two seat motor glider with a retractable Hirth F30A25A  two stroke engine.
AC-7K
 Development of the AC-7M, but with a fuselage-mounted Rotax 912ULS  four stroke engine, driving a retractable  diameter, two bladed wooden propeller.

Specifications (AC-7M)

See also

References

External links

Photo of an AC-7M
Photo of an AC-7M

2000s Russian sailplanes
Aircraft first flown in 2005
Motor gliders